Gulielmus Peregrinus (fl. c. 1190 – 1207), also known as Gulielmus de Canno or William the Pilgrim, was an English epic poet and versificator regis ("king's poet") to Kings Richard I and John.

References

1207 deaths
13th-century English poets
British Poets Laureate
Year of birth uncertain
12th-century English poets
English male poets
12th-century Latin writers
13th-century Latin writers